Shweta Tiwari is an Indian actress who primarily works in the Hindi television industry, where she has established herself as a leading actress. She is the recipient of several awards, including six ITA Awards, eight Indian Telly Awards and eight Star Awards. She received most of the awards for her performance in the television series Kasautii Zindagii Kay (2001-2008).

ITA Awards

Indian Telly Awards

Star Awards

Gold Awards

Apsara Film & Television Producers Guild Awards

Kalakaar Awards

Sansui Television Awards

Star International Awards

References

External links
 

Shweta Tiwari